Bebearia innocua, the innocuous forester, is a butterfly in the family Nymphalidae. It is found in Nigeria and Cameroon. Their habitat consists of forests.

References

Butterflies described in 1889
innocua
Butterflies of Africa
Taxa named by Henley Grose-Smith
Taxa named by William Forsell Kirby